Ergisch is a municipality in the district of Leuk in the canton of Valais in Switzerland.

History
Ergisch is first mentioned in 1203 as Mons de Argessa.

Geography

Of this area, 20.9% is used for agricultural purposes, while 38.0% is forested. Of the rest of the land, 0.9% is settled (buildings or roads) and 40.1% is unproductive land.

Coat of arms
The blazon of the municipal coat of arms is Per fess Azure three Mullets of Six Argent one and two and Gules a Fleur-de-lis and a Double Cross of the second.

Demographics
, 5.2% of the population are resident foreign nationals. Over the last 10 years (1999–2009 ) the population has changed at a rate of 17.5%. It has changed at a rate of 11.3% due to migration and at a rate of -6.9% due to births and deaths.

All of the population speaks German.

, the gender distribution of the population was 50.0% male and 50.0% female.  The population was made up of 89 Swiss men (47.3% of the population) and 5 (2.7%) non-Swiss men.  There were 89 Swiss women (47.3%) and 5 (2.7%) non-Swiss women.  Of the population in the municipality 118 or about 67.0% were born in Ergisch and lived there in 2000.  There were 39 or 22.2% who were born in the same canton, while 15 or 8.5% were born somewhere else in Switzerland, and 4 or 2.3% were born outside of Switzerland.

The age distribution of the population is children and teenagers (0–19 years old) make up 25.6% of the population, while adults (20–64 years old) make up 54.5% and seniors (over 64 years old) make up 19.9%.

, there were 76 people who were single and never married in the municipality.  There were 82 married individuals, 15 widows or widowers and 3 individuals who are divorced.

, there were 68 private households in the municipality, and an average of 2.6 persons per household.  There were 19 households that consist of only one person and 7 households with five or more people.  Out of a total of 69 households that answered this question, 27.5% were households made up of just one person and there were 3 adults who lived with their parents.  Of the rest of the households, there are 15 married couples without children, 27 married couples with children  There were 2 single parents with a child or children.  There were 2 households that were made up of unrelated people and 1 household that was made up of some sort of institution or another collective housing.

 there were 140 single family homes (or 77.3% of the total) out of a total of 181 inhabited buildings.  There were 31 multi-family buildings (17.1%), along with 5 multi-purpose buildings that were mostly used for housing (2.8%) and 5 other use buildings (commercial or industrial) that also had some housing (2.8%).

, a total of 67 apartments (30.7% of the total) were permanently occupied, while 88 apartments (40.4%) were seasonally occupied and 63 apartments (28.9%) were empty.  , the construction rate of new housing units was 5.3 new units per 1000 residents.  The vacancy rate for the municipality, was 0.87%.

The historical population is given in the following chart:

Politics
In the 2007 federal election the most popular party was the CVP which received 65.05% of the vote.  The next three most popular parties were the SVP (20.03%), the SP (12.63%) and the FDP (2.17%).  In the federal election, a total of 121 votes were cast, and the voter turnout was 79.6%.

In the 2009 Conseil d'État/Staatsrat election a total of 122 votes were cast, of which 8 or about 6.6% were invalid.  The voter participation was 82.4%, which is much more than the cantonal average of 54.67%.  In the 2007 Swiss Council of States election a total of 121 votes were cast, of which 7 or about 5.8% were invalid.  The voter participation was 79.6%, which is much more than the cantonal average of 59.88%.

Economy
, Ergisch had an unemployment rate of 1.3%.  , there were 28 people employed in the primary economic sector and about 14 businesses involved in this sector.  3 people were employed in the secondary sector and there were 2 businesses in this sector.  10 people were employed in the tertiary sector, with 5 businesses in this sector.  There were 77 residents of the municipality who were employed in some capacity, of which females made up 41.6% of the workforce.

 the total number of full-time equivalent jobs was 23.  The number of jobs in the primary sector was 12, all of which were in agriculture.  The number of jobs in the secondary sector was 3 of which 2 or (66.7%) were in manufacturing and 1 was in construction.  The number of jobs in the tertiary sector was 8.  In the tertiary sector; 2 or 25.0% were in wholesale or retail sales or the repair of motor vehicles, 4 or 50.0% were in a hotel or restaurant, 1 was in education.

, there were 5 workers who commuted into the municipality and 58 workers who commuted away.  The municipality is a net exporter of workers, with about 11.6 workers leaving the municipality for every one entering.  Of the working population, 14.3% used public transportation to get to work, and 63.6% used a private car.

Religion
Of the rest of the population, there was 1 individual who belongs to the Christian Catholic Church.  4 (or about 2.27% of the population) belonged to no church, are agnostic or atheist.

Education
In Ergisch about 53 or (30.1%) of the population have completed non-mandatory upper secondary education, and 4 or (2.3%) have completed additional higher education (either university or a Fachhochschule).  Of the 4 who completed tertiary schooling, all were Swiss men.

, there were 4 students from Ergisch who attended schools outside the municipality.

References

External links

 

Municipalities of Valais